The Anne and Chris Flowers Foundation and the J.C. Flowers Foundation are charitable organizations founded by private equity investor J. Christopher Flowers and his wife Anne W. Flowers.  They operate primarily by providing funding and logistical support to community organizations that tackle local social issues, primarily malaria in Africa and parolee recidivism in New York.  Recipients have also included Harvard University, the New York Philharmonic Orchestra, various Episcopal and Anglican organizations, and numerous others.

Susan Lassen has been involved with the Flowers philanthropic efforts since 2004 and is currently President of the J.C. Flowers Foundation.

The Anne and Chris Flowers Foundation (founded 2015) and the J.C. Flowers Foundation (founded 2004) are successors to the White Flowers Foundation (founded 1990).

NetsforLife/Malaria Elimination
In October 2004, founder Chris Flowers traveled to several remote areas in Zambia.  On a visit to the Anglican Mission in Fiwila, Zambia, Flowers witnessed the funeral of a child who had died of malaria; and during his tour of Zambia came to realize that communities did not understand the cause of malaria or its prevention.

As a result, the Foundation, in partnership with a number of other organizations, founded NetsforLife.  NetsforLife distributes insecticide-treated anti-malaria bednets in remote areas in Africa, typically in partnership with the local Anglican church. Partners in this effort have included Episcopal Relief and Development, various Anglican organizations in Africa, Coca-Cola, ExxonMobil, Standard Chartered Bank and the Starr Foundation.

In 2010, former Coca-Cola CEO Neville Isdell partnered with the Foundations to establish the Isdell:Flowers Cross-Border Anti-Malaria Initiative, which also distributes anti-malaria bednets, in this case in Angola, Namibia, Zambia and Zimbabwe.

As of December 2014, the Foundations, NetsforLife and the Isdell:Flowers Initiative have raised a total of $34 million for programs to combat malaria in Africa, reaching over 25 million people and distributing over 12 million anti-malaria bednets.

Harlem Parolee Initiative
In 2010, the Foundations launched the Harlem Parolee Initiative in an effort to address the high rates of recidivism within inner-city New York communities.

The Foundations partner with local faith-based communities to provide education and support to recent parolees.  The Foundations also fund resources aimed at reintegrating parolees back into families from which they have typically been absent for significant periods of time.

References

Foundations based in the United States
Non-profit organizations based in New York City